The Minnesota Swarm are a lacrosse team based in Saint Paul, Minnesota playing in the National Lacrosse League (NLL). The 2007 season was the franchise's 3rd season in the league.

Regular season

Conference standings

Game log
Reference:

Playoffs

Game log
Reference:

Player stats
Reference:

Runners (Top 10)

Note: GP = Games played; G = Goals; A = Assists; Pts = Points; LB = Loose balls; PIM = Penalty minutes

Goaltenders
Note: GP = Games played; MIN = Minutes; W = Wins; L = Losses; GA = Goals against; Sv% = Save percentage; GAA = Goals against average

Awards

Transactions

Trades

Roster
Reference:

See also
2007 NLL season

References

Minnesota
2007 in sports in Minnesota